Jean Peyrière (born Marie Henri Georges Jean Vaysse, 10 October 1885 – 7 September 1965) was a French stage and film actor. He appeared in several popular serial films during his career.

Biography
Jean Peyrière was born Marie Henri Georges Jean Vaysse in Vesoul, Haute-Saône, Franche-Comté. He began his career in the film industry in 1913, with an appearance in the Henri Pouctal directed short film Denise opposite actor Philippe Garnier. Following his role in Denise, he would appear in the André Calmettes directed two part serial Les trois mousquetaires (The Three Muskateers), released the following year. Les trois mousquetaires was an early film adaptation of the 1884 Alexandre Dumas novel of the same name.

Peyrière would spend the remainder of the 1910s appearing in films directed by Louis Mercanton, René Hervil, Jean Kemm and René Plaissetty. In 1919, he appeared in the Henri Pouctal directed serial Travail, which ran in seven installments. In 1923 he appeared in the popular Henri Fescourt directed serial Mandrin, starring Romuald Joubé and followed with a role in the Charles Maudru directed serial  Le roi de Paris, starring Jean Dax. Other film serials of the 1920s Peyrière appeared in include Surcouf (1924), directed by Luitz-Morat and starring Jean Angelo; Le Vert Galant (1924), directed by René Leprince; Fanfan la Tulipe (1925), directed again by René Leprince and starring Aimé Simon-Girard; and Le juif errant (1926), directed by Luitz-Morat and starring Gabriel Gabrio.

Jean Peyrière's last film of the 1920s silent film era was the 1929 René Barberis and René Leprince directed drama La tentation (Temptation), starring Lucien Dalsace. Peyrière would only make one sound film, which would also be his last appearance on screen, in the Robert Péguy directed 1937 comedy Monsieur Breloque a disparu, starring Lucien Baroux and Junie Astor.

Following his retirement from the film industry Jean Peyrière settled in Paris where he died in 1965 at age 79.

Filmography

References

External links

1885 births
1965 deaths
French male stage actors
French male film actors
French male silent film actors
People from Vesoul
20th-century French male actors